HMS Iris the lead ship of her class of two ships built for the Royal Navy in the 1870s. They were the first all-steel warships to serve with the Royal Navy.

Design and description
The Iris-class ships were designed as dispatch vessels and were later redesignated as second-class protected cruisers. They displaced  at normal load and were the first British warships with an all-steel hull. Their crew consisted of 275 officers and ratings.

The Iris class was powered by a pair of horizontal four-cylinder Maudslay, Sons and Field compound-expansion steam engines, each driving one propeller shaft using steam from eight oval and four cylindrical boilers. She was initially fitted with a barque sailing rig, but this was removed after a few years.

The Iris-class ships were originally armed with ten 64-pounder rifled muzzle-loading (RML) guns, eight on the main deck and the remaining pair on the upper deck on pivot mounts to serve as chase guns fore and aft.

Construction and career
Iris was laid down at the Pembroke Dockyard on 10 November 1875, launched on 12 April 1877 and completed in April 1879. She served with the Mediterranean Fleet from 1879 to 1887, then in the Portsmouth Reserve from 1887 to 1903.

Citations

Bibliography
 
 
Morris, Douglas (1987). Cruisers of the Royal and Commonwealth Navies. Liskeard: Maritime Books. .
 

 

Iris-class cruisers
Ships built in Pembroke Dock
1877 ships